Zafer Tüzün (born 30 August 1962) is a Turkish former football player, who played as a striker, and manager.

He was best known for his stints at Eskişehirspor, his local club, where he started playing football. He made his professional debut with Eskişehirspor, returned to them when finishing his career, managed them after retiring, and eventually became their president.

Honours
Fenerbahçe
TSYD Cup (3): 1985-86, 1986-87

References

External links
 
 
 TFF Manager Profile

1962 births
Living people
Sportspeople from Eskişehir
Turkish footballers
Turkey international footballers
Turkey youth international footballers
Turkish football managers
Association football forwards
Eskişehirspor footballers
Denizlispor footballers
Kayseri Erciyesspor footballers
Bakırköyspor footballers
Sakaryaspor footballers
Adana Demirspor footballers
Fenerbahçe S.K. footballers
Süper Lig players
TFF First League players
Süper Lig managers